St. Peter's Kierch, also called the Old Kierch or St. Peter's Church, is a historic Lutheran church in Middletown, Dauphin County in the U.S. state of Pennsylvania. Construction began in 1767 and it was dedicated by Henry Muhlenberg in 1769. St. Peter's Kierch was used regularly until 1879 when a large church was completed. It was listed on the National Register of Historic Places in 1973.

Design 
St. Peter's Kierch is a 2½-story, Georgian-style church at the intersection of Union and High Streets in Middletown. The church was constructed from red sandstone. Originally, galleries were located on the east, west and south sides with the wineglass pulpit on the north side. The bell tower was constructed 46 years after the rest of the church, on the west side, as it was not intended to be used an entrance. The sides of the church have three windows reaching to the upper story. Each window has forty-four  panes of glass—eleven panes high, four across.

History 
On September 18, 1764, with the intent of constructing a Lutheran church, a plot of land was purchased by some local residents from George Fisher, founder of Middletown, for 7 shillings and 6 pence, along with an annual rent of one grain of wheat.

The cornerstone of the church was laid on July 13, 1767 by James Burd. The church was dedicated by Henry Muhlenberg on September 12, 1769. The bell tower was constructed in 1813; the bell was cast in Philadelphia by Hedderly and Leverin and hung in 1815.

In 1876, the growth on the congregation led to the decision to build a new church several blocks south of the old one, at Spring and Union Streets. The last regular service was held at the Kierch on January 26, 1879. It is still used, however, for "occasional services and funerals" as well as other special events. St. Peter's Kierch was listed on the National Register of Historic Places on June 17, 1973.

The church has an adjacent cemetery, locally called "God's Acre", that has about 210 people buried who fought in the American Revolution, including Barack Obama's 6th great-grandfather George Frederick Toot.

See also 

 National Register of Historic Places listings in Dauphin County, Pennsylvania

References

Sources 
 

Churches on the National Register of Historic Places in Pennsylvania
Churches in Dauphin County, Pennsylvania
Georgian architecture in Pennsylvania
Lutheran churches in Pennsylvania
Churches completed in 1769
1769 establishments in Pennsylvania
18th-century Lutheran churches in the United States
National Register of Historic Places in Dauphin County, Pennsylvania